Dairylea Cooperative Inc. was a dairy cooperative which was founded in 1907 as The Dairymen's League when group of dairy farmers in Orange County, New York united to increase their bargaining power. In the 1920s, the Cooperative's membership had increased to more than 100,000 farms. While based initially in Pearl River, New York, the organization was most recently headquartered in East Syracuse, New York. They renamed themselves after their most famous product, Dairylea Milk. It was formerly named Dairyman's League Co-Operative Association, and changed its name to its present one in 1969.

While it changed and adapted over the years, Dairylea helped manage the sale and distribution of raw milk from more than 2,500 farms producing 5.5 billion pounds of milk annually. In 2001, it was the largest marketer of raw milk in the northeastern United States. The cooperative was a part of the National Milk Producers Federation. Dairylea merged with Dairy Farmers of America on April 1, 2014.

References

External links
Official website

Dairy products companies of the United States
Dairy cooperatives
Companies based in Syracuse, New York
Food and drink companies established in 1907
DeWitt, New York
1907 establishments in New York (state)
Food and drink companies disestablished in 2014
2014 disestablishments in New York (state)
Defunct companies based in New York (state)
Agricultural cooperatives in the United States